The rattan shield was used by the militaries of China and Korea since the Ming dynasty and the Joseon dynasty, respectively. The Chinese general Qi Jiguang described its use in his book, the Jixiao Xinshu, which was reproduced in the Korean Muyejebo that contains the first Korean account of the shield.

Use
In the classic Korean martial art manuals the use of the rattan shield, or deungpae, is explained in combination with both the spear and the sword. Often a soldier would hold the deungpae and sword in the dominant hand, while holding a spear in his other hand. The spear would be thrown at the opponent, after which the soldier would attack with his sword.

A soldier with a nangseon would back up the soldier fighting with deungpae and sword. They would be part of the so-called Mandarin duck formation (鴛鴦陣) which was invented by the Chinese general Qi Jiguang and is described in his book, the Jixiao Xinshu.

Shield specialists trained in how to advance and retreat but were not allowed to retreat in combat situation because their withdrawal would leave their whole squad exposed, leading to its possible collapse.

The military of the Ming Dynasty employed Rattan Shieldmen (Teng Pai Shou - 藤牌手) on the battlefield equipped with a rattan shield, dao, and javelin  (Biao Qiang - 鏢鎗). 

The Rattan Teng Pai was a common shield type employed by the armies of the Ming as it is cheap, light, flexible, and durable, greatly outperforming comparable wooden shields.  As rattan has no wood grain, it does not split.  

However, rattan does not grow in the climate of Northern China, so troops equipped from that region bore Yuan Pai (圓牌, 'Round shield'), made of willow wicker and covered with leather or rawhide.

The average size of a Ming period rattan shield was roughly the same size as a small Viking shield and rarely featured metal bosses (although exceptions do exist), unlike similar shields in Tibet and Southeast Asia.

Naval Infantry trained in the use of the Rattan shield and Swords (Tengpaiying) 藤牌营 were used by Qing forces against Russian forces in the siege of Albazin in the 1680s. These specialists did not suffer a single casualty when they defeated and cut down Russian forces traveling by raft, only using the rattan shields and swords while fighting naked.

Thereupon [Marquis Lin] ordered all our marines to take off their clothes and jump into the water. Each wore a rattan shield on his head and held a huge sword in his hand. Thus they swam forward. The Russians were so frightened that they all shouted: 'Behold, the big-capped Tartars!' Since our marines were in the water, they could not use their firearms. Our sailors wore rattan shields to protect their heads so that enemy bullets and arrows could not pierce them. Our marines used long swords to cut the enemy's ankles. The Russians fell into the river, most of them either killed or wounded. The rest fled and escaped. [Lin] Hsing-chu had not lost a single marine when he returned to take part in besieging the city.

The above text was written by Yang Hai-Chai who was related to Marquis Lin, a participant in the war.

References

See also 
Tinbe - Shield of Ryukyu. They use same Chinese characters.

Shields
Military equipment of China
Military equipment of Korea